Fontinalis antipyretica, greater water-moss, or common water moss, is a species of submerged aquatic moss belonging to the subclass Bryidae. It is found in both still and flowing freshwater in Europe, Asia, Greenland and Africa. In  North America it is found in most Canadian provinces with a seaboard and most US states except the most southern.

Description

The leaves are quite stiff and are arranged in three overlapping rows.

Distribution and habitat
F. antipyretica is found in Europe, Asia and parts of Africa. It grows attached to submerged rocks in fast-flowing water. It also occurs attached to the substrate in lakes and as floating masses in still water, and may be cast up on beaches at the waterside. It thrives in shady positions and prefers acid water, a pH of around 8.4 being the maximum tolerated. It is replaced in highly acid mountain and moorland streams in the UK by Fontinalis squamosa.

Biology
Reproduction is mostly by stolons or by the rooting of detached fragments. Sexual reproduction does also occur, in the spring in North America, but is relatively unimportant as a means of reproduction. Individual plants are either male or female and the capsules housing the spores are seldom observed.

Ecology
F. antipyretica grows in large clumps and mats and provides refuge for fish eggs and fry. Numerous invertebrates shelter among the fronds; Chironomid larvae hide in the bases of the leaves and mayfly, caddisfly and stonefly larvae cling to the fronds, and in fast-flowing water black fly larvae are often present.  Diatoms and other microscopic algae grow epiphytically on the fronds.

Heavy metal adsorption
The biosorption of cadmium was unaffected by the hardness of the water but that of zinc was affected by rising calcium levels.

Aquarium uses
F. antipyretica was traditionally used in cool-water aquaria, but in tropical aquaria the similarly structured "Java moss" ( a Vesicularia species) takes its place.

Notes

References

Hypnales
Freshwater plants
Taxa named by Johann Hedwig